The Beveridge model is a health care system in which the government provides health care for all its citizens through income tax payments. This model was first established by William Beveridge in United Kingdom in 1948. Under this system, most hospitals and clinics are owned by the government; some doctors and health care professionals are government employees, but there are also private institutions that collect their fees from the government. With the government as the single-payer in this health care system, it eliminates competition in the health care market and helps to keep the costs low. Using income tax as the main funding for health care allows for services to be free at the point of service, and the patients' contribution to taxes covers for their health care expenses.

The Beveridge model emphasizes health as a human right. Thus, universal coverage is provided by the government and anyone who is a citizen is given coverage and access to health care. 

The Beveridge model has its distinct policies, but most countries use variations of this model combined with the other health care approaches. Countries that operate in some variation of the Beveridge model mostly employ a universal health care system. The universal health care system ensures that all residents within a country are guaranteed access to healthcare. The countries that are currently implementing Beveridge model policies include the United Kingdom, Italy, Spain, Denmark, Sweden, Norway, New Zealand and more.

History 
The Beveridge model of health care was first created by William Beveridge, a British economist and social reformer whose ideas led to the creation of Great Britain's National Health Services (NHS) in 1948. The model originated in the United Kingdom and has spread through many areas in Northern Europe and the world.

Criticism 
According to Joseph Kutzin, Coordinator of Health Financing Policy at World Health Organization, a concern regarding the system is how the government is going to respond to the health crisis. In the case of national emergency, the funding for health care may decline as public income decreases. Such a situation would cause many problems with the large influx of patients, and a solution would be to allocate emergency funds prior to any crisis.

See also 

 Beveridge Report
 Bismarck Model
 Semashko model
 The Healing of America

References 

Publicly funded health care
Universal health care
1948 establishments in the United Kingdom